Charadrus or Charadros was a town on the coast of ancient Cilicia, between Platanus and Cragus, according to the Stadiasmus. Strabo, who writes it Χαραδροῦς, describes it as a fort with a port below it, and a mountain Andriclus above it. It is described by Francis Beaufort "as an opening through the mountains with a small river." The mountain is mentioned in the Stadiasmus under the name Androcus. 

Charadrus is located near modern Yakacık (formerly Kaledıran İskelesi), in Turkey.

References

Populated places in ancient Cilicia
Former populated places in Turkey
History of Mersin Province